Muddy, Brass & the Blues, sometimes referred to as Brass and the Blues, is an album by the blues musician Muddy Waters, released by Chess Records in 1966.

Critical reception
AllMusic wrote: "Stripped of his guitar once again (the cover photo notwithstanding), Waters proved what a great R&B singer he was—there are moments on this album where he almost crosses over into Otis Redding territory."

Track listing 
 "Corine, Corina" (Bob Miller) – 3:38
 "Piney Brown Blues" (Pete Johnson, Big Joe Turner) – 3:16
 "Black Night" (Jessie Mae Robinson) – 3:22
 "Trouble in Mind" (Richard M. Jones) – 2:51
 "Going Back to Memphis" (Will Shade) – 2:40
 "Betty and Dupree" (Chuck Willis) – 3:04
 "Sweet Little Angel" (Robert Nighthawk) – 3:33
 "Take My Advice" (Jesse Anderson, Gene Barge) – 2:56
 "Trouble" – 2:26	
 "Hard Loser" (McKinley Morganfield) – 3:05

Personnel 
Muddy Waters – vocals, guitar
James Cotton – harmonica
Otis Spann – piano
James ‘Pee Wee’ Madison, Sam Lawhorn – guitar
Calvin Jones – bass
Willie Smith – drums
Gene Barge – tenor saxophone
Unknown musicians – alto saxophone, baritone saxophone, trumpet, trombone, organ

References 

1966 albums
Muddy Waters albums
Chess Records albums
Albums produced by Ralph Bass